The knockout phase of UEFA Euro 2020 began on 26 June 2021 with the round of 16 and ended on 11 July 2021 with the final at Wembley Stadium in London, England.

Times listed are Central European Summer Time (UTC+2). If the venue is located in a different time zone, the local time is also given.

Format
In the knockout phase, if a match was level at the end of 90 minutes of normal playing time, extra time was played (two periods of 15 minutes each), where each team was allowed to make a sixth substitution. If still tied after extra time, the match was decided by a penalty shoot-out to determine the winners.

UEFA set out the following schedule for the round of 16:
 Match 1: Winner Group B vs 3rd Group A/D/E/F
 Match 2: Winner Group A vs Runner-up Group C
 Match 3: Winner Group F vs 3rd Group A/B/C
 Match 4: Runner-up Group D vs Runner-up Group E
 Match 5: Winner Group E vs 3rd Group A/B/C/D
 Match 6: Winner Group D vs Runner-up Group F
 Match 7: Winner Group C vs 3rd Group D/E/F
 Match 8: Runner-up Group A vs Runner-up Group B

As with every tournament since UEFA Euro 1984, there was no third place play-off.

Combinations of matches in the round of 16
The specific match-ups involving the third-placed teams depended on which four third-placed teams qualified for the round of 16:

Qualified teams
The top two placed teams from each of the six groups, along with the four best-placed third teams, qualified for the knockout phase.

Bracket

Round of 16

Wales vs Denmark

Italy vs Austria

Netherlands vs Czech Republic

Belgium vs Portugal

Croatia vs Spain

France vs Switzerland

England vs Germany

Sweden vs Ukraine

Quarter-finals

Switzerland vs Spain

Belgium vs Italy

Czech Republic vs Denmark

Ukraine vs England

Semi-finals

Italy vs Spain

England vs Denmark

Final

Notes

References

External links

UEFA Euro 2020
2020
Austria at UEFA Euro 2020
Belgium at UEFA Euro 2020
Croatia at UEFA Euro 2020
Czech Republic at UEFA Euro 2020
Denmark at UEFA Euro 2020
England at UEFA Euro 2020
France at UEFA Euro 2020
Germany at UEFA Euro 2020
Italy at UEFA Euro 2020
Netherlands at UEFA Euro 2020
Portugal at UEFA Euro 2020
Spain at UEFA Euro 2020
Sweden at UEFA Euro 2020
Switzerland at UEFA Euro 2020
Ukraine at UEFA Euro 2020
Wales at UEFA Euro 2020